Gabriola is a genus of moth in the family Geometridae.

Species
Gabriola dyari Taylor, 1904
Gabriola minima (Hulst, 1896)
Gabriola minor Rindge, 1974
Gabriola regularia McDunnough, 1945
Gabriola sierrae McDunnough, 1945
Gabriola tenuis Rindge, 1974

References
Natural History Museum Lepidoptera genus database
Frederick H. Rindge (1974), A revision of the moth genus Gabriola (Lepidoptera, Geometridae). American Museum of Natural History (New York).

External links
  Picture of Gabriola dyari on flickr. Accessed on 2010-01-02.

Nacophorini
Moth genera